"Let's Go" is a song written by Peitor Angell and sung by freestyle singer Nocera, who co-produced the song with Floyd Fisher and Peitor Angell and remixed by Little Louie Vega. It was released in 1987 as the second single (after 1986's "Summertime Summertime") from her debut album Over the Rainbow. The track became her second top ten hit on [[Dance Club Songs|Billboard'''s Dance/Disco Club Play]] chart, peaking at number 8 in August 1987.

Track listing
US 12" single

References

External links
Music Video from YouTube
Nocera's Club MTV'' performance at YouTube

1987 singles
Nocera (singer) songs
Sleeping Bag Records singles
1987 songs